Wellington Harbour (historically known as Port Nicholson)  is a large natural harbour on the southern tip of New Zealand's North Island. New Zealand's capital city, Wellington, is located on parts of its western and southern sides. Lower Hutt is located on parts of its northern and eastern sides.

The harbour, the sea area bounded by a line between Pencarrow Head to Petone foreshore, was officially named Port Nicholson until it assumed its current dual name in 1984. It is now a regional park, overseen by Wellington Regional Council.

In the Māori language the harbour is known as Te Whanganui-a-Tara, "the great harbour of Tara". Another Māori name for Wellington, Pōneke, is said to be a transliteration of Port Nick (Port Nicholson).

Geography

Wellington Harbour is an arm of Cook Strait, covering some 76 km², with a two-kilometre wide entrance at its southern end between Pencarrow Head and Palmer Head on the southern tip of Miramar Peninsula. It has a maximum length of over 11 kilometres and a width of 9.25 kilometres. The harbour has an entrance over 1.6 kilometres wide from shore to shore and as it is surrounded by hills over 300 meters high, it provides sheltered anchorage in a region where wind velocities may exceed 160 km/h. The depth of water over the great bulk of the harbour exceeds 20 metres or 10 fathoms.

The harbour is of seismic origin, and a major earthquake fault lies along its western shore. At the northern end of the harbour lies the narrow triangular plain of the Hutt River, which largely follows the line of the earthquake fault to the north-east. The city of Lower Hutt is located on this plain.

The central city suburbs spread around the hills overlooking the west and south-west of Wellington Harbour and its two large bays, Lambton Harbour and Evans Bay. Lambton Harbour is surrounded by the reclaimed land of Wellington's central business district and contains the majority of the city's port facilities. Evans Bay is an inlet between Mt Victoria and the Miramar Peninsula that serves as a flight path to low-lying Wellington Airport. The small Oriental Bay features beaches and cafes.

To the east of the harbour lie several small bays, most of which are populated by small coastal communities. The largest of these suburban settlements is Eastbourne, directly to the east of the northern tip of the Miramar Peninsula.

The small islands Matiu / Somes Island, Mākaro / Ward Island and Mokopuna Island are located in the harbour.

The entrance to the harbour can be quite dangerous, especially since Cook Strait to the south is notoriously rough. Close to the harbour's entrance lies Barrett Reef, where rocks break the water's surface at low tide.

History

Pre-European history

According to oral history, Wellington Harbour was first discovered by the Polynesian explorer Kupe.

A traditional Māori name for the area, Te Upoko o te Ika a Maui, is derived from Māori legend and translates literally as "the head of Maui's fish".

Te Whanganui a Tara, another Māori name from the area, translates literally as "the great harbour of Tara". It is believed to refer to Whatonga's son Tara, who was sent down from the Māhia Peninsula by his father to explore southern lands for their people to settle.

Modern history

William Wakefield named the harbour Lambton Harbour in 1839 in honour of the Earl of Durham, who had the family name of "Lambton".

Port Nicholson is said to have received its name from Captain James Herd, who sailed into the Harbour of Tara in 1826 and left it with its first European name, calling it after Sydney's Harbourmaster Captain John Nicholson however, while Herd is attributed to the first charts describing Te Whanganui a Tara as "Port Nicholson" it is likely that Captain John Rodolphus Kent of the cutter Mermaid had previously named it after the harbormaster, his superior officer.

The New Zealand Company established settlements in Petone and Wellington from 1840.

The 1855 Wairarapa earthquake uplifted the north-western side of the Wellington bay. This led to the reclamation of Wellington Harbour, which increased the availability of flat land for Wellington City.

In 1968, the inter-island passenger ferry Wahine grounded at Barrett Reef, near the harbour entrance, during a storm. Fifty-one people died.

Transport

Wellington Harbour is a significant port serving the lower North Island, with the Regional Council-owned company Centreport recording around 14,000 commercial shipping movements each year. Wellington Harbour, the region's third largest container port, is located in Wellington City. There is a tanker terminal at Seaview in Lower Hutt.

Wellington harbour ferries first began operating at the end of the 19th century and regular crossings from central Wellington to Days Bay continue today. The harbour is also used by inter-island ferries, linking Wellington to Picton. A project to develop a walking and cycling route around the harbour, the Great Harbour Way, is gathering momentum.

Recreation

The Wellington South Coast and harbour entrance is exposed to open sea, providing places to dive and fish. There are also fishing spots at the rocks and reclamations within the harbour.

Harbour beaches like Oriental Bay, Petone Bay, Days Bay and Hataitai Beach are suited to swimming and sunbathing.

The harbour accommodates a range of activities, with five water ski lanes, an area for personal water craft and areas for windsurfing. Several rowing, waka ama and yachting clubs operate from the harbour.

Small boat craft can anchor at Mākaro / Ward Island and Mokopuna Island and can also visit the Matiu / Somes Island reserve during daylight hours. Harbour cruises also travel regularly between the main Wellington waterfront, Matiu / Somes Island, Days Bay and Petone.

Gallery

See also

 Reclamation of Wellington Harbour
 Miramar Peninsula
 Porirua Harbour

References

External links
 CentrePort Wellington
 Positively Wellington Waterfront
 Greater Wellington Regional Council

 
Wellington Region
Ports and harbours of New Zealand
Cook Strait
Cook Strait Ferry
Regional parks of New Zealand